There have been 38 head coaches of the Bulldogs club since their introduction into top-grade rugby league competition in 1935. Of these, most were full-time coaches, but six of them filled a captain-coach role while playing for the team.

See also

List of current NRL coaches
List of current NRL Women's coaches

References

External links
Bulldogs History Database
Bulldogs statistics

Sydney-sport-related lists
National Rugby League lists
Lists of rugby league coaches